Welcome to Hollywood is a 1998 mockumentary film directed by Adam Rifkin.

Synopsis
A young man (Tony Markes) tries to make it in Hollywood as an actor. Various attempts to get noticed for consideration for roles in film and television fail. He finally gets a break and lands a guest spot on Baywatch, but it ends with disaster when he steps on a stingray and has to be hospitalized.

Celebrity cameos
The film includes cameos from numerous actors, actresses, producers, models, athletes, and other Hollywood figures, including:

Alison Anders
Tom Arnold
Halle Berry
Sandra Bullock
Glenn Close
Wes Craven
Cameron Crowe
Cameron Diaz
Roger Ebert
Carmen Electra
Angie Everhart
Laurence Fishburne
Peter Fonda
Jeff Goldblum
Cuba Gooding Jr.
Woody Harrelson
David Hasselhoff
Salma Hayek
Evander Holyfield
Dennis Hopper
Ron Howard
Mike Leigh
Matthew McConaughey
Ewan McGregor
Anthony Minghella
Kelly Monaco
Julianne Moore
Cathy Moriarty
Pat O'Brien
Nancy O'Dell
Jada Pinkett Smith
Kelly Preston
Fred Roggin
Steve Schirripa
Joel Schumacher
Ron Shelton
Will Smith
Mira Sorvino
John Travolta
Ally Walker
John Waters
Irwin Winkler
Robert Wuhl
Diana Herbert

External links
 
 

1998 films
1990s English-language films
1998 comedy films
American mockumentary films
Films directed by Adam Rifkin
Films set in Los Angeles
Films about actors
Films about Hollywood, Los Angeles
1990s American films